Still Life is the fourth studio album by Swedish progressive metal band Opeth. It was produced and engineered by Opeth alongside Fredrik Nordström, and released on 18 October 1999 through Peaceville Records. It was the only Opeth album to be released through Peaceville, following the band's departure from Candlelight and Century Black after the release of My Arms, Your Hearse, and the first album to feature Martin Mendez.

Background

Concept 
Like its predecessor, My Arms, Your Hearse, Still Life is a concept album. Frontman Mikael Åkerfeldt explains: "Still Life was not Satanic but an anti-Christian theme. It sounds pretty naive when I explain it like this. It kind of takes place a long time ago when Christianity had a bigger importance than it has today. The main character is kind of banished from his hometown because he hasn't got the same faith as the rest of the inhabitants there. The album pretty much starts off when he is returning after several years to hook up with his old 'babe'. Obviously a lot of bad things start happening with, as I call it on the album, 'the council.' The big bosses of the town know that he's back. A lot of bad things start happening. They see him as a hypocrite in a way. It's almost like a devil's advocate or whatever it's called." The album then proceeds to portray Melinda's proclamation of love towards the protagonist. These events lead to her murder and the main character going on a rampage against the ones responsible. The last song of the record, "White Cluster" concludes the story with his execution and him meeting Melinda in the afterlife.

Preparation
Due to time constraints, the band was able to rehearse only twice before entering the studio. Delays with the album's artwork pushed the release back an additional month, and the album was released in Europe under the Peaceville/Snapper label on 18 October 1999. Due to problems with the band's new distribution network, the album was not released in American stores until 27 February 2001.

Still Life was the first Opeth album to bear any kind of caption on the front cover besides the band logo upon its initial release.

Style
Eduardo Rivadavia of Allmusic called Still Life a "formidable splicing of harsh, often jagged guitar riffs with graceful melodies".

Release and reception

The album was re-released by Peaceville Records in 2000 as a slipcase version and again as a digipak version in 2003. A third re-release came out on 31 March 2008, with reworked album artwork by original artist Travis Smith. This new edition has two discs, the first one being a remastered stereo mix of the album on Audio CD and the second one being an Audio DVD containing a 5.1 surround sound mix. The DVD also contains a live video for the album track "Face of Melinda" from The Roundhouse Tapes live performance in London. The remastered and remixed versions of the original recordings were done by Jens Bogren.

Accolades
In 2014, TeamRock put Still Life at #83 on their "Top 100 Greatest Prog Albums Of All Time" list with Jordan Griffin stating that it is "still regarded by many fans as a career high point, Still Life’s deft blend of beauty and brutality was lauded by metal and prog fans. Opeth’s first true classic.". Loudwire placed the album at #54 on their "Top 90 Hard Rock and Heavy Metal Albums of the 1990s" list commenting that Opeth closed out the 90s with their strongest album yet. In 2021, it was named one of the 20 best metal albums of 1999 by Metal Hammer magazine.

Track listing

Personnel
Credits for Still Life adapted from liner notes.

Opeth
 Mikael Åkerfeldt − vocals, guitars, mixing (DVD)
 Peter Lindgren − guitars
 Martin Mendez − bass
 Martin Lopez − drums

Production
 Fredrik Nordström − engineering, mixing
 Isak Edh − engineering
 Göran Finnberg − mastering
 Jens Bogren − 2008 reissue remastering, 5.1 remix, mixing (DVD)
 Travis Smith − album art, photography
 Harry Valimaki – photography
 Timo Ketola – logo

Release history

References

External links 

 Opeth website

Albums produced by Fredrik Nordström
Opeth albums
1999 albums
Concept albums
Albums recorded at Studio Fredman
Peaceville Records albums
Albums with cover art by Travis Smith (artist)